Misty Anne Upham (July 6, 1982 – October 5, 2014) was a Blackfeet actress. She attracted critical acclaim for her performance in the 2008 film Frozen River, for which she was nominated for an Independent Spirit Award for Best Supporting Female. She also appeared in Jimmy P: Psychotherapy of a Plains Indian and August: Osage County.

Early life
Misty Anne Upham was born on July 6, 1982, in Kalispell, Montana, and raised in Auburn, Washington. A Native American, she was a member of the Blackfeet Nation. She was reportedly sexually abused, assaulted and gang-raped, first as a child and then later in life as an up-and-coming actress in Hollywood by an executive at The Weinstein Company. Both Upham and family members reported that she suffered from depression and the severe after effects of these traumas.

Career
Upham's film credits include Expiration Date, Edge of America, Skins and Skinwalkers. In 2010, she appeared on HBO's Big Love. In 2013, she played a major supporting role in Arnaud Desplechin's Jimmy P: Psychotherapy of a Plains Indian, selected in competition for the Palme d'Or at the 66th Festival de Cannes. She played the housekeeper Johnna in August: Osage County, and played Liz in Cake.

Death
On October 5, 2014, Upham left her sister's apartment on the Muckleshoot Reservation in Auburn, Washington, on foot. The following weekend, her family announced via Facebook and other media that she had not been heard from since then and that they were concerned for her wellbeing, citing past mental health problems. A spokesman for the Auburn Police Department told CNN that police had not opened an investigation and were not regarding Upham as a missing person at that time. He confirmed that family members had contacted police on several occasions in the past year to report Upham missing but that she had been located and determined to be safe within a few days in each previous case.

On October 16, 2014, Misty Upham's body was found by a small search party organized by her family and other members of the Muckleshoot Tribe. Her body was found at the bottom of a cliff in a wooded area, just a short distance from where the family had previously searched. Members of the search party believe her death was an accident; that she fell off the cliff in the dark and that her life could have been saved had there been a prompt and thorough search. Citing lack of action on the part of the Auburn police, and alleging past abuse of Misty Upham by members of the Auburn Police Department, Upham's family released a statement that reads in part: 
"But the real tragedy is this could have been prevented on a lot of levels. We pleaded with the Auburn Police to help us find Misty but Commander Stocker made the decision that Misty did not fit the criteria of the Washington State Endangered Missing Persons Plan. This became a point of contention between us and the Auburn PD. In a statement he gave to the press he said Auburn PD doesn't have any evidence that Misty is actually missing. He went on to say that Misty packed her belonging and left her apartment. This was an inaccurate statement. We believe that Commander Stocker had animosity against Misty due to a previous encounter."
"Now press reports are saying that Auburn police department found Misty. The truth is the Native American community formed a search party and found her after several days of searching without the help of the Auburn PD".

On December 3, 2014, the King County Medical Examiner released a report stating Misty Upham had died of blunt-force injuries to her head and torso on October 5, 2014, the day she disappeared. The medical examiner stated that "the manner of her death – whether by foul play, suicide or accident – could not be determined."

In late October 2016, the upcoming release of a documentary on Upham was announced. 11 Days - The Search for Misty Upham investigates her disappearance and death, and the search for her led by her family in what they report was the absence of police support. It is scheduled to appear at Native American film festivals, notably in the broader context of the ongoing issue of Missing and Murdered Indigenous Women (MMIW).

On October 15, 2017, in the wake of the Harvey Weinstein sexual abuse allegations, Upham's father, Charles Upham, went public with allegations that his daughter was raped by a member of Weinstein's production team at the same Golden Globes ceremony where she was honored, and that other members of Weinstein's team had not only witnessed the rape but had cheered the rapist.

Legacy

After her death, The Yale Indigenous Performing Arts Program created The Misty Upham Award for Young Native Actors in 2021 to honor Misty's legacy and her hope of uplifting more young Native actors. The Misty Upham Award was created in 2021 and each year the award honors a Native actor under 25 with an award, $500 cash prize, and performance opportunities. Misty was an inspiration. Her talent, artistry, and career broke barriers for many and it is important that that part of her legacy be celebrated and remembered. Each year, young actors submit performances of monologues from Native plays for a chance to win this award.

Filmography

References

External links
 
 11 Days - The Search for Misty Upham - 2016 independent documentary about her disappearance, death, and the lack of police search or investigation

1982 births
2014 deaths
Accidental deaths from falls
Actresses from Montana
American television actresses
American film actresses
Blackfeet Nation people
Native American actresses
Native American actors
People from Kalispell, Montana
Actresses from Seattle
21st-century American actresses
People from Auburn, Washington
21st-century Native American women
21st-century Native Americans